A garbage patch is a gyre of marine debris particles caused by the effects of ocean currents and increasing plastic pollution by human populations. These human-caused collections of plastic and other debris, cause ecosystem and environmental problems that affect marine life, contaminate oceans with toxic chemicals, and contribute to greenhouse gas emissions. Once waterborne, marine debris becomes mobile. Flotsam can be blown by the wind, or follow the flow of ocean currents, often ending up in the middle of oceanic gyres where currents are weakest. Garbage patches grow because of widespread loss of plastic from human trash collection systems. 

The United Nations Environmental Program estimated that "for every square mile of ocean" there are about "46,000 pieces of plastic." The 10 largest emitters of oceanic plastic pollution worldwide are, from the most to the least, China, Indonesia, Philippines, Vietnam, Sri Lanka, Thailand, Egypt, Malaysia, Nigeria, and Bangladesh, largely through the rivers Yangtze, Indus, Yellow, Hai, Nile, Ganges, Pearl, Amur, Niger, and the Mekong, and accounting for "90 percent of all the plastic that reaches the world's oceans."  Asia was the leading source of mismanaged plastic waste, with China alone accounting for 2.4 million metric tons.

The best known of these is the Great Pacific garbage patch which has the highest density of marine debris and plastic. Other identified patches include the North Atlantic garbage patch between North America and Africa, the South Atlantic garbage patch located between eastern South America and the tip of Africa, the South Pacific garbage patch located west of South America, and the Indian Ocean garbage patch found east of south Africa listed in order of decreasing size. In the Pacific Gyre, specifically 20°N-40°N latitude, large bodies with floating marine debris can be found. Models of wind patterns and ocean currents indicate that the plastic waste in the northern Pacific is particularly dense where the Subtropical Convergence Zone (STCZ), meets a southwest–northeast line, found north of the Hawaiian archipelago.

In the Pacific, there are two mass buildups: the western garbage patch and the eastern garbage patch, the former off the coast of Japan and the latter between Hawaii and California. The two garbage patches are both part of the great Pacific garbage patch, and are connected through a section of plastic debris off the northern coast of the Hawaiian islands. These garbage patches contain  of debris.

2017 research  reported "the highest density of plastic rubbish anywhere in the world" on remote and uninhabited Henderson Island in South Pacific as a result of the South Pacific Gyre. The beaches contain an estimated 37.7 million items of debris together weighing 17.6 tonnes. In a study transect on North Beach, each day 17 to 268 new items washed up on a 10-metre section.

Identified patches 
In 2014, there were five areas across all the oceans where the majority of plastic concentrated. Researchers collected a total of 3070 samples across the world to identify hot spots of surface level plastic pollution. The pattern of distribution closely mirrored models of oceanic currents with the North Pacific Gyre, or Great Pacific Garbage Patch, being the highest density of plastic accumulation. The other four garbage patches include the North Atlantic garbage patch between the North America and Africa, the South Atlantic garbage patch located between eastern South America and the tip of Africa, the South Pacific garbage patch located west of South America, and the Indian Ocean garbage patch found east of south Africa.

Great Pacific

South Pacific

Indian Ocean

North Atlantic

Environmental issues

Photodegradation of plastics 

The North Atlantic patch is one of several oceanic regions where researchers have studied the effects and impact of plastic photodegradation in the neustonic layer of water. Unlike organic debris, which biodegrades, plastic disintegrates into ever smaller pieces while remaining a polymer (without changing chemically). This process continues down to the molecular level. Some plastics decompose within a year of entering the water, releasing potentially toxic chemicals such as bisphenol A, PCBs and derivatives of polystyrene. 

As the plastic flotsam photodegrades into smaller and smaller pieces, it concentrates in the upper water column. As it disintegrates, the pieces become small enough to be ingested by aquatic organisms that reside near the ocean's surface. Plastic may become concentrated in neuston, thereby entering the food chain. Disintegration means that much of the plastic is too small to be seen. Moreover, plastic exposed to sunlight and in watering environments produce greenhouse gases, leading to further environmental impact.

Effects on marine life 
The 2017 United Nations Ocean Conference estimated that the oceans might contain more weight in plastics than fish by the year 2050. Some long-lasting plastics end up in the stomachs of marine animals. Plastic attracts seabirds and fish. When marine life consumes plastic allowing it to enter the food chain, this can lead to greater problems when species that have consumed plastic are then eaten by other predators.

Animals can also become trapped in plastic nets and rings, which can cause death. Plastic pollution affects at least 700 marine species, including sea turtles, seals, seabirds, fish, whales, and dolphins. Cetaceans have been sighted within the patch, which poses entanglement and ingestion risks to animals using the Great Pacific garbage patch as a migration corridor or core habitat.

Plastic consumption 

With the increased amount of plastic in the ocean, living organisms are now at a greater risk of harm from plastic consumption and entanglement. Approximately 23% of aquatic mammals, and 36% of seabirds have experienced the detriments of plastic presence in the ocean. Since as much as 70% of the trash is estimated to be on the ocean floor, and microplastics are only millimeters wide, sealife at nearly every level of the food chain is affected. Animals who feed off of the bottom of the ocean risk sweeping microplastics into their systems while gathering food. Smaller marine life such as mussels and worms sometimes mistake plastic for their prey. 

Larger animals are also affected by plastic consumption because they feed on fish, and are indirectly consuming microplastics already trapped inside their prey. Likewise, humans are also susceptible to microplastic consumption. People who eat seafood also eat some of the microplastics that were ingested by marine life. Oysters and clams are popular vehicles for human microplastic consumption. Animals who are within the general vicinity of the water are also affected by the plastic in the ocean. Studies have shown 36% species of seabirds are consuming plastic because they mistake larger pieces of plastic for food. Plastic can cause blockage of intestines as well as tearing of interior stomach and intestinal lining of marine life, ultimately leading to starvation and death.

Entanglement 
Not all marine life is affected by the consumption of plastic. Some instead find themselves tangled in larger pieces of garbage that cause just as much harm as the barely visible microplastics. Trash that has the possibility of wrapping itself around a living organism may cause strangulation or drowning. If the trash gets stuck around a ligament that is not vital for airflow, the ligament may grow with a malformation. Plastic’s existence in the ocean becomes cyclical because marine life that is killed by it ultimately decompose in the ocean, re-releasing the plastics into the ecosystem.

References 

 
Ocean currents